Cewekku Jutek (English translation: My girlfriend is a snob, or My girl is snobby) is a soap opera that aired on RCTI in 2003. The soap opera starred Agnes Monica and Roger Danuarta. This soap opera has won at the Panasonic Awards as category "Favourite Actress" in 2003.

Synopsis 
In this soap opera Agnes Monica plays a high school girl named Zie who has a snobby personality and is quick to anger. Luckily she meets Joe, played by Roger Danuarta and little by little her attitude improves.

Cast 
 Agnes Monica as Zie.
 Roger Danuarta as Joe.
 Poppy Maretha

Theme song 
The single "Indah", sung by Agnes Monica, became the opening theme and ending theme in the soap opera.

Award

References 

Indonesian television soap operas
2000s Indonesian television series